WWFP (90.5 FM) is a non-commercial Christian radio station based in Brigantine, New Jersey. It is owned by Hope Christian Church of Marlton, Inc.. It serves the general Atlantic City metro area. The station's main transmitter is located atop the Golden Nugget casino and hotel in Atlantic City.

History
The station began broadcasting in 2006, and was owned by CSN International. In 2008, CSN International sold WWFP, along with a number of other stations, to Calvary Radio Network, Inc. These stations were sold to Calvary Chapel Costa Mesa later that year. In 2009, the station was sold to Hope Christian Church of Marlton for $50,000.

References

External links

WFP
Brigantine, New Jersey
WFP
Radio stations established in 2006
2006 establishments in New Jersey